Somchai Chanthavanij (born 10 May 1947) is a Thai sports shooter. He competed at the 1976 Summer Olympics, the 1984 Summer Olympics and the 1988 Summer Olympics.

References

1947 births
Living people
Somchai Chanthavanij
Somchai Chanthavanij
Shooters at the 1976 Summer Olympics
Shooters at the 1984 Summer Olympics
Shooters at the 1988 Summer Olympics
Place of birth missing (living people)
Shooters at the 1986 Asian Games
Somchai Chanthavanij
Somchai Chanthavanij